"Heaven on the 7th Floor" is a pop song that became a 1977 hit single for British singer Paul Nicholas. It was his biggest U.S. hit, a track from his eponymous debut LP. The song spent three weeks at number 6 on the U.S. Billboard Hot 100. during November and December of that year. "Heaven On The 7th Floor" became a Gold record. It reached number 49 in Canada.

The song was not among Nicholas' most popular hits in Britain, although it was a Top 10 hit in other nations. On the 22 October 1977 American Top 40 radio program, Casey Kasem described Nicholas as "a performer who didn't want to be there," i.e., on the musical charts. Having had a successful film career in Europe for 10 years, he had come to America to audition for a stage production of Hamlet, however, he was not selected. Nicholas felt that musical success might help him make more of a name for himself, and would open a door for him into bigger acting roles. Kasem said of this strategy, "He makes the music industry sound easier than it really is."

The song was written by Dominic Bugatti and Frank Musker. Backing vocals on the Nicholas version quote a small portion of the Irving Berlin standard "Cheek to Cheek."

Chart performance

Paul Nicholas version

The Mighty Pope version

"Heaven on the 7th Floor" was covered by The Mighty Pope, and charted concurrently with Nicholas' version. In Canada, the Mighty Pope's version was the bigger hit. It was issued by RCA Records on the Private Stock label, and reached #14. It also reached number 83 on the U.S. Cash Box chart.

See also
 List of 1970s one-hit wonders in the United States

References

External links
 Lyrics of this song

1977 singles
1977 songs
Private Stock Records singles
RSO Records singles
Disco songs
Songs written by Frank Musker
Number-one singles in New Zealand
Paul Nicholas songs
Songs written by Dominic Bugatti